4ME was a digital advertorial datacasting service that launched on 18 September 2011 by Prime Media Group and Brand New Media. It was formerly available to homes in the Prime7/GWN7 viewing area on channel 64, and the Seven-owned viewing area on channel 74 unless you were in an overlap market like the Sunshine Coast, in that case 4ME was both on channel 64 and 74. The channel was closed at midnight on 30 April 2016 in regional areas after Brand New Media entered administration due to business troubles. 4ME later ceased broadcasting in Seven-owned areas on 19 May 2016.

As a datacasting channel, the content on the channel was regulated, it did consist of mostly information, and the scope for entertainment was limited. It showed mainly Australian made informational programs and infomercials, and as a datacasting service, it was prohibited from broadcasting programs that were wholly or substantially infotainment or lifestyle programs longer than 10 minutes.

History

When launched in regional areas on 18 September 2011, the channel was known as Television 4. The channel changed to the name of TV4ME, when it was introduced to metropolitan areas in December 2011. It changed its name again, this time to 4ME, in 2013.

On 29 April 2016, Brand New Media, joint owner of 4ME alongside Prime Media Group, called in administrators after being hit with a series of "perfect storms" throughout its business interests. Prime announced that they will not renew the contract 4ME and LCN 64 on Prime-owned stations was re-purposed as an additional feed of Prime's other datacast channel ishop TV at midnight on 30 April 2016. 4ME went off the air on Seven-owned stations on 19 May 2016 and was replaced with a placeholder card notifying viewers that the channel was unavailable. The channel was removed from the Seven multiplex on 26 May 2016.

See also

 List of digital television channels in Australia

References

Prime Media Group
Seven Network
Defunct television channels in Australia
Digital terrestrial television in Australia
Television channels and stations established in 2011
Television channels and stations disestablished in 2016
English-language television stations in Australia
2011 establishments in Australia
2016 disestablishments in Australia
Home shopping television stations in Australia